An oil spill ignition appeared in Molo, Kenya, on January 31, 2009, and resulted in the deaths of at least 113 people and critical injuries to over 200 more. The incident occurred when an oil spill from an overturned truck burst into flames as onlookers attempted to obtain remnants of the spilled fuel for personal use. Rescuers suggested the cause to be static electricity, an accidentally-discarded cigarette, or an individual angered at a police blockade who sought vengeance. Police have described the carnage as Kenya's worst disaster in recent times, occurring in a country hit by frequent fuel shortages and just days after a supermarket fire killed 25.

In June 2009, another similar accident occurred, when an oil tanker fire killed at least four and injured nearly 50 people at Kapokyek village near Kericho. The victims were siphoning fuel from the tanker that had fallen off the road.

Kenyan disaster management 
The fire was the second such disaster in Kenya that week, following the deaths of at least 25 people in a Nairobi supermarket when a branch of Nakumatt  caught fire. The Kenyan media has been criticizing the government for its poor safety standards and inadequate disaster preparation. Following that blaze, the Daily Nation reported that Nairobi's three million inhabitants were served only by one fire station situated close to a traffic-choked business district.

References

See also
 2017 Bahawalpur explosion, similar disaster in Kenya
Catastrophe of Sange (2010), a similar incident in DR Congo involving a tanker truck, fuel scavenging, and a lit cigarette
Okobie road (2012) and Ibadan road (2000) tanker explosions, similar incidents in Nigeria
Caphiridzange explosion (2016), similar incident in Mozambique

2011 Kenya pipeline fire

2009 fires in Africa
2009 in Kenya
Fires in Kenya
Deaths caused by petroleum looting
January 2009 events in Africa
2009 disasters in Kenya
Tanker explosions